Mizpah may refer to:

Places

 Mizpah, Minnesota, U.S.
 Mizpah, New Jersey, U.S.
 Mizpah in Benjamin, mentioned in the bible
 Mizpah in Gilead (disambiguation), the name of several places mentioned in the bible
 Mizpah (Moab), mentioned in the bible
 Mizpah (Judah), mentioned in the bible
 Mizpah Hotel, a historic hotel in Tonopah, Nevada, U.S.
 Mizpah Spring Hut, in the White Mountains of New Hampshire, U.S.

Other uses
 Mizpah, pen name of Mildred A. Bonham (1840–1907)
 Mizpah Congregation, a synagogue Chattanooga, Tennessee, U.S.
 Mizpah (emotional bond)
 Mizpah (steamboat), which ran on Puget Sound
 , a United States Navy patrol yacht converted from a private vessel of the same name in 1942